The 2021–22 St. Cloud State Huskies men's ice hockey season was the 87th season of play for the program. They represented St. Cloud State University in the 2021–22 NCAA Division I men's ice hockey season and for the 9th season in the National Collegiate Hockey Conference (NCHC). They were coached by Brett Larson, in his fourth season, and played their home games at Herb Brooks National Hockey Center.

Season
After reaching the championship game for the first time in program history, St. Cloud entered this season hoping to return and complete the job. The Huskies returned most of the men from the year before and lost none of the principle players, giving them a leg-up in the teamwork department. They retained the high ranking from the end of 2021 as they began the season and did so in tremendous fashion, scoring 12 goals in the season opener. While it did come against St. Thomas, a team that was playing its first game at the Division I level, it was still an impressive start. The second week could not have been a bigger contrast as the Huskies faced the #1 team in the nation, Minnesota State. St. Cloud acquitted itself well with a split, a feat that repeated the next week against #4 Minnesota. After a sweep of Wisconsin, St. Cloud found itself as the #1 ranked team and set about proving that they were worth of the honor.

A loss in mid-November caused the team to slip down to #2 but the Huskies took a bigger hit when they were swept by a surprising Western Michigan squad just before Thanksgiving. After following with another split, the Huskies fell out of the top-5 for the first time and entered the winter break with a solid but unspectacular record. St. Cloud was, however, the beneficiary of playing in the toughest conference in the nation. With their good non-conference mark, the team could afford a few losses and still earn a return to the national tournament.

After coming back with a sweep of Bemidji State, St. Cloud's season was put on hold due to positive COVID-19 tests that forced several games around the country to be delayed or cancelled. They didn't get back onto the ice until late-January and, though the Huskies played well in their return, the extra time off appeared to have taken the jam out of their game. St. Cloud went through a 6-game streak without a win and plummeted in the conference standings. Three ties during that run prevented them from falling out of postseason contention, but they found themselves on the edge by mid-February. A good weekend against WMU helped arrest their slide but they were back in trouble after losing two to Omaha.

The final five game of the Huskies season would make or break the team and 5th-year starter Dávid Hrenák came up huge. He sandwiched three stirling performances against Minnesota Duluth around a pair of wins that kept the team's head above water, making it all but certain that St. Cloud would receive an at-large bid regardless of what happened in the postseason. Unfortunately, as the Huskies were preparing for the conference quarterfinals, Hrenák came down with pneumonia and was unable to play. Backup Jaxon Castor had played decently in spots during the season, so there was hope that the team could play well enough defensively to insulate the understudy. That hope was banished by Duluth, who fired a total of 79 shots on goal in the two games, and scored 9 goals to knock St. Cloud out in the first round.

As was expected, however, St. Cloud State ended the season as #10 in the PairWise rankings and was guaranteed a spot in the tournament. With Hrenák on the mend, the team would need to put forth a better effort and give their starter the time he needed to return. In the opening game they faced the nation's top defensive team, Quinnipiac. The Huskies got behind early, allowing two goals in the first, but then responded by completely outplaying the Bobcats in the final 40 minutes. St. Cloud scored three times in the second, tying the game on two separate occasions, and limited their opponents to just 16 shots on goal. Senior Nolan Walker led the way with a 3-point night as the team scored four goals against Quinnipiac, the most they had allowed all season. Unfortunately, Castor did not play well in goal. He was beaten on 5 of the shots he faced and St. Cloud's season ended in heartbreaking fashion.

Departures

Recruiting

Roster
As of August 30, 2021.

Standings

Schedule and results

|-
!colspan=12 style=";" | Regular season

|-
!colspan=12 style=";" | 

|- align="center" bgcolor="#e0e0e0"
|colspan=12|St. Cloud State Lost Series 0–2
|-
!colspan=12 style=";" |

Scoring statistics

Goaltending statistics

Rankings

Note: USCHO did not release a poll in week 24.

Awards and honors

Players drafted into the NHL

2022 NHL Entry Draft

† incoming freshman

References

2021–22
St. Cloud State Huskies
St. Cloud State Huskies
St. Cloud State Huskies
St. Cloud State Huskies